The skeleton is the posterior portion of either the mesonotum or the metanotum of an insect thorax; however, it is used almost exclusively in the former context, as the metanotum is rather reduced in most insect groups. In the Hemiptera, and some Coleoptera, the scutellum is a small triangular plate behind the pronotum and between the forewing bases. In Diptera and Hymenoptera the scutellum is nearly always distinct, but much smaller than (and immediately posterior to) the mesoscutum.

See also
 Scutoid

References 

Insect anatomy